Vagabonds is the third album from rock band the Classic Crime. The album was released on April 6, 2010. The profits from all pre-orders were donated to the earthquake victims of Haiti. "Solar Powered Life", "Cheap Shots", "Four Chords", "The Count" and "Everything And Nothing" can be listened to on the band's MySpace page. "Solar Powered Life" was the first radio single with an adds date to alternative/modern rock radio of March 29, 2010

Track listing
All songs written by Matt MacDonald, except where noted.
 "A Perfect Voice" - 2:49
 "Cheap Shots" (MacDonald, Robert Negrin) - 3:29
 "Solar Powered Life" - 2:05
 "Four Chords" - 3:36
 "Vagabonds" - 3:42
 "The Happy Nihilist" - 3:27 
 "My Name" - 4:21
 "Everything & Nothing" (Justin DuQue, MacDonald) - 4:02
 "The Count" - 3:44
 "Different Now" - 3:57
 "Broken Mess" - 4:18

Deluxe edition
 "Weapon of Choice (Demo)" - 3:09
 "Walk With Me" - 5:03

Singles
 "Four Chords"
 "Solar Powered Life"
 "A Perfect Voice"

Credits
 Michael "Elvis" Baskette - producer, mixing
 Dave Holdredge - engineer
 Jef Moll - digital editing

Personnel
Matt Macdonald - Vocals & Guitar
Justin DuQue - Guitar
Robert Negrin - Guitar
Alan Clark - Bass
Paul Erickson - Drums

References

Tooth & Nail Records albums
2010 albums
The Classic Crime albums
Albums produced by Michael Baskette